Zurak (also Romanized as Zūrak and Zoorak; also known as Zang and Zonk) is a village in Dalfard Rural District, Sarduiyeh District, Jiroft County, Kerman Province, Iran. At the 2006 census, its population was 48, in 6 families.

References 

Populated places in Jiroft County